Reuilly–Diderot is a station on Line 1 and Line 8 of the Paris Métro.

The station was opened on 13 August 1900, a month after trains began running on the original section of line 1 between Porte de Vincennes and Porte Maillot on 19 July 1900. The line 8 platforms opened on 5 May 1931 with the extension of the line from Richelieu–Drouot to Porte de Charenton. It takes its name from its location on the Boulevard Diderot, named after Denis Diderot, joint editor of the Encyclopédie, and the rue de Reuilly, named after the former hamlet of Reuilly, now integrated into the 12th arrondissement.

Station layout

Gallery

References
Roland, Gérard (2003). Stations de métro. D’Abbesses à Wagram. Éditions Bonneton.

Paris Métro stations in the 12th arrondissement of Paris
Railway stations in France opened in 1900